Te Parau Tinito  (Tahitian for 'Chinese speech') is a moribund pidgin language spoken by ethnic Chinese in Tahiti, primarily in the capital Papeete. It is losing ground to Tahitian and French, and speakers are elderly.

References

Tahiti
pidgins and creoles